One Step to Eternity (French:Bonnes à tuer, Italian:Quattro donne nella notte) is a 1954 French-Italian thriller film directed by Henri Decoin and starring Danielle Darrieux, Michel Auclair and Corinne Calvet. It was shot at the Boulogne Studios in Paris. The film's sets were designed by the art director Jean d'Eaubonne.

Plot
A French newspaper editor invites his wife, ex-wife, mistress and intended fiancée to his apartment, planning to murder one of them.

Cast
 Danielle Darrieux as Constance Andrieux dite Poussy 
 Michel Auclair as François Roques dit Larry  
 Corinne Calvet as Véra Volpone 
 Miriam Di San Servolo as Maggy Lang 
 Lyla Rocco as Cécile Germain-Thomas  
 Gérard Buhr as William Jordan  
 Roberto Risso as Mario Mirador  
 Gil Delamare as Forestier  
 Ky Duyen as Bao, le serviteur  
 Émile Genevois as Le postier  
 Jean Berton as Un inspecteur  
 Jean Sylvère as L'aveugle
 Jacques Jouanneau as Le flic 
 Raymond Gerome as Un client de la boîte

References

External links 
 

1954 films
French thriller films
Italian thriller films
1950s thriller films
1950s French-language films
Films directed by Henri Decoin
Films set in Paris
Films based on American novels
French black-and-white films
Italian black-and-white films
1950s Italian films
1950s French films